Energy rating may refer to:

Energy rating label, an appliance energy efficiency rating used in Australia and New Zealand
European Union energy label, an appliance energy efficiency rating used in Europe
EnergyGuide, an appliance energy efficiency rating used in the United States
EnerGuide, labeling and rating of the energy consumption or energy efficiency of specific products used in Canada
Building energy rating
Energy efficiency rating, a score applied to dwellings in the Australian Capital Territory
House Energy Rating, a building's thermal performance for residential homes in Australia
Home energy rating, a measurement of a home's energy efficiency, used primarily in the United States
National Home Energy Rating, an accreditation scheme for energy assessors and a rating scale for the energy efficiency of housing in the United Kingdom

See also
Energy Star, an international standard for energy efficient consumer products originated in the United States
Energy input labeling
Ecolabel
Energy efficiency (disambiguation)
Energy Efficiency Ratio or EER, a figure of merit for the efficiency of air conditioners, used in the United States